The Light Rail Transit Association (LRTA), formerly the Light Railway Transport League (LRTL),  is a non-profit organisation whose purpose is to advocate and encourage research into the retention and development of light rail and tramway/streetcar systems. The LRTA publishes the monthly magazine Tramways & Urban Transit (formerly Modern Tramway), and is based in the United Kingdom but with an international membership and remit.

History 
The Light Railway Transport League was formed in 1937, and renamed to the LRTA in 1979. It was formed at a time when Britain's urban tramways were starting to decline.

Because of the decline, the association campaigned for modern light rail in the UK, as typified by some "Stadtbahn" systems in Germany. The openings of the Tyne and Wear Metro in 1980, Manchester Metrolink in 1991 and new tram systems in Sheffield, Birmingham, Croydon and Nottingham are very much in line with the aims of the LRTA.

See also 
National Tramway Museum
Scottish Tramway and Transport Society
Campaign for Better Transport

References

External links

Light rail in the United Kingdom
Tram transport in the United Kingdom
Transport advocacy groups of the United Kingdom
Organizations established in 1937